The Women's heavyweight competition at the 2009 World Taekwondo Championships was held at the Ballerup Super Arena in Copenhagen, Denmark on October 18. Heavyweights were over 73 kilograms in body mass.

Medalists

Results
Legend
DQ — Won by disqualification
WD — Won by withdrawal

Finals

Top half

Section 1

Section 2

Bottom half

Section 3

Section 4

References
Draw
Official Report

Women's 99